"It's Wonderful" is a popular song by The Young Rascals, and their last single under that name. Written by group members Felix Cavaliere and Eddie Brigati and with a dual lead vocal from them, it was included on the group's 1968 album Once Upon a Dream).  It climbed as high as #20 on the Billboard Hot 100.

The single's B-side, "Of Course", did not appear on Once Upon a Dream, but would be held over for the group's next album, Freedom Suite.

1967 singles
1968 singles
The Rascals songs
Songs written by Felix Cavaliere
Songs written by Eddie Brigati
Atlantic Records singles
1967 songs